Medal is a 2022 Gujarati-language  film, directed by Dhaval Jitesh Shukal. Starring Jayesh More,Kinjal Rajpriya, Maulik Nayak, Hemang Dave, Chetan Daiya,  and others, written by Vaishak Ratanben, directed by Dhaval Jitesh Shukla, Edited by Rraja Sanjay Chokshi and produced by Dhruvin Dakshesh Shah and distributed by Rupam Entertainment .

Plot 
A young English teacher chooses to teach at a government school by declining a dream job at private school. He fights against social stigmas, cultivate young minds and trains them to win a Medal at Khel Kala Mahakumbh, will they win?

Cast 
 Jayesh More as Ajit
 Kinjal Rajpriya as Anjali Mehta
 Maulik Nayak as Raman
 Hemang Dave as Mohan
 Vaishakh Ratanben as Girish
 Chetan Daiya as the sarpanch of Timli
 Bhavya Sirohi as Jashoda ("Jasli") 
 Archan Trivedi as the principal of Timli school
 Shounak Vyas 
 Aakash Zala
 Nisarg Trivedi
 Jagurti Thakor
 Arvind Vegda
 Haresh Dagia 
 Dipen Raval 
 Niyati Suthar
 Master Karan Patel
 Kabir Daiya
 Arya Sagar
 Rishabh Thakor
 Rishi Panchal

Marketing and Release 
The teaser of the film released in end of august by producer Dhruvin Shah and it got 1 million views and trended on YouTube.   The official trailer was released on YouTube on 19 October 2022.  The film was released for 25 November 2022.

Soundtrack

Tracklist 
The soundtrack of the album is composed by Kushal Chokshi  with lyrics written by Niren Bhatt. The soundtrack album consists of eight tracks.

References

External links 
 

2022 films
2020s Gujarati-language films
 Films shot in Gujarat